John of Dreux may refer to:
Jehan de Braine (died 1240), trouvère
John I of Dreux (died 1249) 
John II of Dreux (died 1309)